Natsumi Ikegaya (born 14 June 1990) is a Japanese professional footballer who plays as a goalkeeper for WE League club AC Nagano Parceiro.

Club career 
Ikegaya made her WE League debut on 26 September 2021.

References 

Living people
1990 births
Women's association football goalkeepers
WE League players
Japanese women's footballers
Association football people from Shizuoka Prefecture
AC Nagano Parceiro Ladies players